Nimo Owelle, also known as Nimo, is a large town in southeastern Nigeria. , the traditional ruler of Nimo is Igwe Maxi Ike Oliobi.

Location 
Nimo is located in the local government area of Njikoka in Anambra State. Nimo's postal code is 421102. Its neighbouring towns are Enugwu Ukwu, Abagana, Neni, Eziowelle, Abatete, Oraukwu, Adazi, Nri, and Abacha.

History 
Igbo historical tradition states that Owelle had four sons, whom he begot at his residence in Owe. Their names were Nimo Owelle, Abagana, Abba, and Eziowelle. Nimo Owelle had two wives. The first wife bore Okpaladinwe and Ojideleke; the second wife bore Ezenebo and Okpalabani. Okpaladinwe and  Ojideleke begot Etiti Nimo and Egbengwu, respectively. Ezenebo and Okpalabani begot Ifiteani and Ifite-enu, respectively. The tradition states that these four grandsons of Nimo Owelle (Etiti Nimo, Egbengwu, Ifiteani, Ifite-enu) and their descendants occupy what is known today as Nimo.

Composition 
Nimo is made up of four quarters (or clans) and their constituent villages. The four quarters are Etiti Nimo, Egbengwu, Ifiteani, and Ifite-enu. , there are 45 villages in Nimo.

Every adult in Nimo is eligible to join the Nimo Town Development Union (NTDU), formerly known as the Nimo Brotherhood Society (NBS). NTDU is led by a President General (PG). The current PG is Chief Agbalanze Ekenenna Okafor. He replaced the late Chief Frank Igboka, a former Chairman of Njikoka local government.

Kingship and tradition 
The traditional ruler of Nimo is known by the title "Owelle of Nimo". He chairs the royal cabinet made up of the "Onowu of Nimo”, other titled individuals, and Ndi Ichie representing the various villages of Nimo.

Notable places of tradition in Nimo include Oye Nimo (the central market) and Egwegwe (the town square).

Cultural festivals and tourist attractions 
 Awam Ji: the annual New Yam festival (also known as “Alo Mmụọ” Festival and usually held in August)
 Uha Festival: the annual thanksgiving dance celebration (or Ofala) of the Owelle Nimo.
 Nimo Cultural Day: the annual celebration of the entire Nimo people (usually held at the Egwegwe every 26 December)
 Oye Nimo: the Nimo central market that has served as the place for commerce and exchange for Nimo villages and surrounding towns for centuries.
 Asele Institute: a cultural centre that is renowned for its rich archives on contemporary and modern art.

Notable people 
Justice G.C.M. Onyiuke SAN 
Justice G.U. Ononiba 
Prof. Charles Ejikeme Chidume 
Col. Ben Gbulie  
Prof. Uche Okeke
Kiki Omeili

References 

Towns in Igboland
Towns in Anambra State
Populated places in Igboland
Populated places in Anambra State